Lewis Gilbert Wilson (January 28, 1920 – August 9, 2000) was an American actor, who was most famous for being the first actor to play DC Comics character Batman on screen in the 1943 film serial Batman.

Life and career
Wilson was born January 28, 1920, in Framingham, Middlesex, Massachusetts, the son of Lucile (née Gregg) and John Henry Wilson. He grew up in Littleton, Massachusetts, where his father was minister of the First Unitarian Church from 1927-1945. Wilson graduated from Worcester Academy in Worcester, Massachusetts in 1939. His family had long roots with the school and his father and grandfather were graduates.

Following the entry of the United States into World War II, in 1943 Columbia Pictures created the first Batman live action series, simply called Batman. Wilson was cast as the title character in the 15-episode serial against J. Carrol Naish who portrayed a Japanese spy named Dr. Daka. It was Wilson's screen debut at the age of 23. A sequel to the serial was made in 1949, but Robert Lowery replaced Wilson as Batman.

After the war concluded, Wilson and his family moved to California, and he and his wife joined the Pasadena Playhouse. His final film was Naked Alibi in 1954. He then left show business and worked for General Foods for many years.

Wilson married novelist and actress Dana Natol, and they had a son, Michael G. Wilson. They met while attending the Academy of Dramatic Arts at Carnegie Hall in New York, but separated and divorced after moving to California.

After retiring from acting, he lived in North Hollywood, California.

Death
He died on August 9, 2000, in San Francisco, California at age 80.

Filmography

Film

Television

References

External links

1920 births
2000 deaths
American male film actors
Worcester Academy alumni
Male actors from New York City
People from Greater Los Angeles
20th-century American male actors